Conrad Schirokauer, was a German-American historian and writer. Born on April 29, 1929 in Leipzig, he died in Cleveland, Ohio on September 19, 2018.  His father, Arno Schirokauer, was a German-Jewish literary scholar and philologist.

Schirokauer's family left Germany in 1938, in flight from the Nazi regime, and, after three years in Italy, eventually migrated to the United States where they settled in Tennessee in 1938, and eventually moved to Baltimore, MD. He graduated high school from Williston Academy in 1946 as the valedictorian.

He completed his BA in history at Yale in 1950 and his PhD in history at Stanford in 1960 with a dissertation on 12th century Chinese political thought.  From 1962 to 1991, he taught history, first as an assistant professor, then as an associate and from 1977 as full professor, at the City University of New York.  He specialized in East Asian historiography, particularly Chinese and Japanese history.

Conrad Schirokauer married Lore Strich in November 1956. They had met as children in Italy in the mid-thirties.

Bibliography 
Schirokauer is the author of books including:
 A Brief History of Chinese and Japanese Civilizations, also published separately as A Brief History of Chinese Civilization and A Brief History of Japanese Civilization
Chu Hsi's political career: A study in ambivalence

With Robert P. Hymes, he is the co-editor of:
 Ordering the World: Approaches to State and Society in Sung Dynasty China (1993)

He is also the translator of a book by Ichisada Miyazaki:
 China's Examination Hell: The Civil Service Examinations of Imperial China

References

Further reading
Andreas W. Daum, "Refugees from Nazi Germany as Historians: Origins and Migrations, Interests and Identities," in The Second Generation: Émigrés from Nazi Germany as Historians. With a Biobibliographic Guide, ed. Andreas W. Daum, Hartmut Lehmann, James J. Sheehan. New York: Berghahn Books, 2016, 1‒52.

External links 
 

20th-century American historians
21st-century American historians
20th-century American male writers
21st-century American male writers
Historians of China
Historians of Japan
Yale University alumni
Stanford University alumni
City University of New York faculty
Living people
American male non-fiction writers
Year of birth missing (living people)